Gastón Emiliano Cuevas (born 21 February 1993) is an Argentine football player who plays as a midfielder.

Career
Cuevas spent time in the youth ranks of Herrera del Alto, Atlético Termas and Atlético Tucumán. He made his professional debut for the latter in June 2013, playing twenty-two minutes in a Primera B Nacional defeat to Douglas Haig. He had previously been an unused substitute in matches against Instituto and Almirante Brown. Cuevas made one appearance in 2012–13, before making eleven over the course of 2013–14 and 2014. On 23 August 2017, Cuevas joined Sportivo Italiano of Primera C Metropolitana. However, he left three months later after only two games. Tier four Atlético Concepción signed Cuevas in 2019.

Career statistics
.

References

External links

1993 births
Living people
People from Termas de Río Hondo
Argentine footballers
Association football midfielders
Primera Nacional players
Argentine Primera División players
Primera C Metropolitana players
Atlético Tucumán footballers
Sportivo Italiano footballers
Sportspeople from Santiago del Estero Province